The Republican Party (PR) was a micro political party in Romania created by former members from the party of the same name, dissatisfied by its merger into the Party of Social Democracy in Romania (PDSR at that time, currently PSD). It ceased activity before 2004, when the name was taken over by the Party of the Third Millenium.

History 

The Republican Party contested the 1996 elections receiving 0.14% (Chamber) and 0.16% (Senate), leaving the party seatless. The 2000 elections saw its votes share fall again to 0.10% and 0.11%.

Electoral history

Legislative elections

References 

Defunct political parties in Romania